Trnje is a district in the City of Zagreb, Croatia. According to the 2011 census, the district had 42,282 residents. It is located in the central part of the city, south of Donji grad across the railway (Zagreb Main Station), east of Trešnjevka (Savska road), west of Peščenica (Vjekoslav Heinzel Avenue and Marin Držić Avenue), and north of the river Sava. The Slavonska Avenue intersects Trnje.

Trnje was amalgamated into the city in 1927 by Mayor Vjekoslav Heinzel, along with several other new districts, mainly for the purpose of housing people needed for Zagreb's industrial sector expansion.

As a district, Trnje has an elected council.

List of neighborhoods in Trnje

Cvjetno naselje
Kanal
Kruge
Martinovka
Savica
Sigečica
Vrbik
Zavrtnica

References

Districts of Zagreb